Richard J. Carling (born December 6, 1937), was an American politician who was a Republican member of the Utah House of Representatives and Utah State Senate. An attorney, he attended the University of Utah where he earned a law degree. He is an avid runner and has run in over 155 races, including over 35 Honolulu Marathons and 38 consecutive Boston Marathons.

References

1937 births
Living people
Republican Party members of the Utah House of Representatives
Republican Party Utah state senators